Alessandra Iozzi (born 25 January 1959) is an Italian-born mathematician known for her research in geometric group theory. Originally from Rome, she holds Italian, Swiss, and American citizenships, and works as an adjunct professor of mathematics at ETH Zurich.

Education and career
Iozzi obtained a laurea at the Sapienza University of Rome in 1982, supervised by Massimo Picardello. Then, she moved to the University of Chicago where she earned a Master's Degree in 1985 and a Ph.D. in 1989. Her dissertation, Invariant Geometric Structures: A Non-Linear Extension of the Borel Density Theorem, was supervised by Robert Zimmer.

After holding a lecturer position at the University of Pennsylvania for two years, she became a postdoctoral scholar first at the Mathematical Sciences Research Institute in Berkeley, CA and then at the Institute for Advanced Study in Princeton, NJ. From 1992 to 2000, she held a faculty position at the University of Maryland, College Park.

She first came to ETH Zurich as a visiting researcher in 2000–2001. After holding professorships at the University of Strasbourg in France and the University of Basel in Switzerland, she returned to ETH Zurich as a senior scientist in 2006 and took her present faculty position there in 2008.

Recognition
Iozzi was named a Fellow of the American Mathematical Society, in the 2022 class of fellows, "for contributions to geometric group theory and the geometry of discrete subgroups of Lie groups, in particular higher Teichmuller theory."

References

External links
Home page

1959 births
Living people
Italian mathematicians
Italian women mathematicians
Swiss mathematicians
Swiss women mathematicians
20th-century American mathematicians
21st-century American mathematicians
American women mathematicians
Sapienza University of Rome alumni
University of Chicago alumni
University of Maryland, College Park faculty
Academic staff of the University of Strasbourg
Academic staff of the University of Basel
Academic staff of ETH Zurich
Fellows of the American Mathematical Society
20th-century American women
21st-century American women